Linda fasciculata is a species of beetle in the family Cerambycidae. It was described by Maurice Pic in 1902. It is known from China and Vietnam.

References

fasciculata
Beetles described in 1902